Justice League 3000 is a comic book series published by DC Comics. Taking place in the future of the DC Universe as part of The New 52, the series features a 31st century iteration of the Justice League, with new versions of Superman, Batman, Wonder Woman, the Flash, and Green Lantern. The series is written by JM DeMatteis and Keith Giffen and illustrated by Howard Porter. Justice League 3000 began publication in December 2013.

Synopsis 
In the 31st Century, humanity has spread its influence across the stars and in an age where heroes are in dire need, the Justice League is reformed for peacekeeping across space. Project Cadmus, a genetic engineering corporation, had held the genetic material of the greatest past original Justice League heroes for over a millennium  and Wonder Twins (Teri and Terry) used those samples to recreate Superman, Green Lantern, Batman, Wonder Woman, and The Flash. Using advanced bio-engineering, the duo enabled the creation and survival of duplicates of the five superheroes, but with only fragments of their memories, experiences, heroic mentalities and powers. In desperation to contain a growing intergalactic threat, Cadmus presses on with their Justice League 3000 experiment with the objective of restoring interstellar order.

The friendships that existed and possibly drove the previous JL are either different, strained or nonexistent. For example, Batman and Superman seem to despise each other. The Flash does not have his "antifriction aura", and requires an artificial one to prevent incineration. Green Lantern does not have a ring, instead being a living incarnation of the emerald energy, and using a "cloak" that keeps his green aura power in check and prevents it from killing him. Superman has neither heat vision nor flight capabilities, and the team continuously reminds him of these as he forgets often (although he does exhibit flight powers in a few scenes in issue #1).

Publication history 
The series was first mentioned at a DC Comics Retailer Roadshow, and later announced by Comic Book Resources that the title would reunite Justice League International writers Keith Giffen, JM Dematteis and Kevin Maguire, along with character designs by artist Howard Porter. In August 2013, Maguire was let go from the title; Howard Porter would take over art duties, with the title's premiere being pushed back to December. The series was originally solicited for October.

The writers had offered little on the background of the team or characters, stating that they were new characters, and not descendants of existing characters. Despite Justice League 3000 launching the month following the cancellation of Legion of Super-Heroes, as well as taking place within the same time period, writer Keith Giffen has confirmed that Justice League 3000 is not directly "tied together" with Legion of Super Heroes because "it would be unfair to put out a book that insists you're familiar with another book".

The book ended in March 2015 with issue #15, and was relaunched in June as Justice League 3001.

Early reception 
In early September 2013, Complex listed Justice League 3000 as number 21 on its list of "The 25 Most Anticipated Comic Books of Fall 2013", stating that it is "hard to argue with that creative team and the sleek new designs".

Collected editions

References 

2015 comics endings
Comics set in the 31st century
Justice League
Justice League titles
DC Comics superhero teams
Comics by J. M. DeMatteis
Comics by Keith Giffen